Mitzi Meyerson is an American harpsichordist and photographer.

Biography
She was born into a musical family in Chicago, Illinois, where she began her concert career at the age of seven. After completing her university and graduate studies in Chicago and Oberlin, Ohio, she moved to London to co-found the ensemble Trio Sonnerie (with Monica Huggett and Sarah Cunningham), with whom she performed and recorded extensively.

Mitzi Meyerson specializes in researching little-known or lost works for the harpsichord, which she then brings to light in recordings. Without exception, these CD documents are received with the highest acclaim, many of them winning international awards and prizes. She recently discovered the lost collection of "Chamber Airs for the Violin with Through Bass" by Richard Jones, a composer in London at the time of Handel. The world premiere recording of these works had just been released on the Glossa label. Ms. Meyerson has released over sixty recordings, all to excellent critical acclaim; notable amongst them are solo albums of Dietrich Buxtehude, Jacques Duphly, "Musikalischer Parnassus" of Johann Caspar Ferdinand Fischer, Ordres from the 4th Book of Francois Couperin, "Componenti Musicali" of Gottlieb Muffat, and the complete works for harpsichord by Richard Jones. Her CD prizes include the "Choc" award from Monde de la Musique", "Editor's Choice" from Gramophone Magazine, and the Diapason d'Or. Ms Meyerson's recent releases include two double-disc sets of Claude Balbastre (2004) (Glossa), which, together with the previous recording of Georg Böhm harpsichord works were awarded the prestigious Deutsche Schallplatten Kritik prize for the best recordings of the year on an international level. The two-disc complete harpsichord works of Richard Jones was chosen as "CD of the Month" by Toccata magazine, "Editor′s Choice" in Concerto Magazine, and received unilaterally excellent reviews from many publications including Gramophone Magazine, which described it as "the best harpsichord disc of the year".
Mitzi Meyerson has discovered several additional collections of completely unknown works, which are awaiting CD production . She continues to do active research in this field.

Ms Meyerson is a full professor of historical keyboard instruments (harpsichord and fortepiano) at the Universität der Künste in Berlin. This position was especially created for Madame Wanda Landowska, and this university was the first institution ever to offer harpsichord studies in modern times.

Mitzi Meyerson has many outside interests. She is a certified doula (birth assistant), has been a university lecturer on doula training, and has personally assisted at dozens of births. She has a keen love of photography and has been featured in several successful one-woman shows in Germany and England.

Mitzi Meyerson divides her time between her research, a busy teaching schedule, and concert engagements throughout the world.

References

External links
 Mitzi Meyerson's homepage
  Academy Instructor for the 2012 Westfield Center Harpsichord Academy

American expatriates in the United Kingdom
American harpsichordists
American music educators
American women music educators
Living people
Musicians from Chicago
American performers of early music
Women performers of early music
Year of birth missing (living people)
Educators from Illinois
Classical musicians from Illinois
21st-century American women